The Central American montane forests are an ecoregion of the tropical and subtropical moist broadleaf forests biome, as defined by the World Wildlife Fund, located in mountains of Central America.

Geography
It extends from Chiapas state in southeastern Mexico, through Guatemala, El Salvador, and Honduras, to northern Nicaragua.

The montane forests ecoregion is surrounded at lower elevations by the Central American pine–oak forests, except  for the enclaves in northern Guatemala, northern Honduras, and central Nicaragua, which are bounded by the Central American Atlantic moist forests.

The ecoregion covers an area of 2. The ecoregion has a temperate climate with relatively high precipitation levels.

Climate
The climate is humid and montane. Average annual rainfall ranges from 2000 to 4000 millimeters, with many areas experiencing regular heavy cloud cover. At the highest elevations, regular nighttime frosts occur between December and March.

Flora
Plant communities include lower montane wet forest, lower montane moist forest, montane forest, and subalpine grassland.

The Guatemalan subalpine grassland plant community occurs above 3,050 m (10,000 ft) on the high volcanoes on the border between Guatemala and Mexico's Chiapas state, including Volcán Tacaná and Volcán Tajumulco. On Tacaná, subalpine grasslands occur above a belt of Juniperus standleyi shrubs that define the treeline at about 4000 meters elevation. The subalpine grasslands are dominated by Lupinus montanus and tussocks of the grass Calamagrostis vulcanica growing up to 1 meter high. Other grasses and herbaceous plants include Alchemilla pinnata, Arenaria bryoides, Draba volcanica, Festuca tolucensis, Gentiana pumilio, Gnaphalium salicifolium, Haplopappus stolonifer, Lobelia nana, Luzula racemosa, Pernettya prostrata, Potentilla heterosepala, Viola nannei, Weldenia candida, and Werneria nubigena. Mosses form the ground layer, and the moss Racomitrium crispulum dominates rocky outcrops. Other subalpine grasses include Bromus carinatus, Briza rotunda, Festuca amplissima, Muhlenbergia gigantea, M. macroura, M. robusta, Piptochaetium virescens, Stipa ichu, and Trisetum irazuense.

Fauna
The horned guan (Oreophasis derbianus) is an endemic bird.

The narrow-nosed harvest mouse (Reithrodontomys tenuirostris) is endemic to the subalpine grasslands.

Protected areas
31.34% of the ecoregion is in protected areas. Protected areas include La Tigra National Park (242.4 km2), Cerro Saslaya National Park (150 km2), Lago de Yojoa Multiple Use Area (442.3 km2), Montecristo National Park (19.7 km2), Macizos de Peñas Blancas Natural Reserve (113.1 km2), Cordillera Dipilto and Jalapa Natural Reserve (412 km2), Cerro Kilambe Natural Reserve (101.3 km2), Cerro Tisey–Estanzuela Nature Reserve (93.4 km2), Montecristo Trifinio National Park (82.9 km2), and Celaque National Park (266.3 km2).

References

External links

 Central American montane forests (DOPA)
 Central American montane forests (Encyclopedia of Earth)

 
Neotropical tropical and subtropical moist broadleaf forests
Ecoregions of Central America
Montane forests
Ecoregions of El Salvador
Ecoregions of Guatemala
Ecoregions of Honduras
Ecoregions of Mexico
Ecoregions of Nicaragua

Forests of El Salvador
Forests of Mexico
Forests of Nicaragua
Sierra Madre de Chiapas